Gordon J. Murphy (born February 23, 1967) is a Canadian former professional ice hockey defenceman who played 14 seasons in the National Hockey League (NHL) for the Philadelphia Flyers, Boston Bruins, Florida Panthers and Atlanta Thrashers. He is currently an assistant coach for the New York Rangers.

Playing career
He was drafted by the Philadelphia Flyers in the ninth round, 189th overall, of the 1985 NHL Entry Draft. After playing three seasons in the Ontario Hockey League with the Oshawa Generals, Murphy made his professional debut with the Flyers' AHL affiliate, the Hershey Bears, in the 1987–88 season.  In 1988–89, he joined the Flyers.  After three-plus seasons in Philadelphia Murphy was traded, along with Brian Dobbin and a 1992 third-round draft choice, to the Boston Bruins for Garry Galley and Wes Walz in January of 1992.

Murphy was selected by the Florida Panthers in the 1993 NHL Expansion Draft, and he played there for six seasons.  The Panthers traded him to another expansion team, the Atlanta Thrashers, as part of a deal made in the 1999 NHL Expansion Draft in which the Panthers acquired goaltender Trevor Kidd.  Murphy spent two seasons in Atlanta before joining the Bruins once again for the 2001–02 season.  After one season in the Bruins organization, he officially retired on March 19, 2002.

In his NHL career, Murphy played in 863 games.  He scored 85 goals and added 238 assists.  He also played in 53 Stanley Cup playoff games, scoring three goals and recording 16 assists.  He was a member of the 1996 Florida Panthers, who won the Eastern Conference before losing in the Stanley Cup Finals.

Coaching career
He worked as an assistant coach with the Columbus Blue Jackets from the 2002–03 NHL season until he was fired as a part of an overall coaching change on June 16, 2010.  After working for Florida Panthers as an assistant coach, Murphy was fired on November 8, 2013 along with head coach Kevin Dineen and assistant coach Craig Ramsay. He was hired as an assistant coach by the Flyers on June 18, 2014. He was fired on November 28, 2018.  On August 2, 2019, the New York Rangers announced the hiring of Murphy as an associate head coach with the Hartford WolfPack, the Rangers AHL affiliate.

Personal life
Murphy and his wife Nicole have two sons, Tyler and Connor and one daughter, Lexi. His son, Connor Murphy, was drafted 20th overall in the 2011 NHL Entry Draft by the Phoenix Coyotes and is a defenceman for the Chicago Blackhawks.

Awards
 Barry Ashbee Trophy (Philadelphia Flyers top defenceman): 1989–90 season

Career statistics

Regular season and playoffs

International

References

External links
 

1967 births
Living people
Atlanta Thrashers players
Boston Bruins players
Canadian ice hockey coaches
Canadian ice hockey defencemen
Columbus Blue Jackets coaches
Florida Panthers coaches
Florida Panthers players
Hershey Bears players
Oshawa Generals players
People from Willowdale, Toronto
Philadelphia Flyers coaches
Philadelphia Flyers draft picks
Philadelphia Flyers players
Providence Bruins players
Sportspeople from North York
Ice hockey people from Toronto